Hasan Abu Nimah (born September 11, 1935) is a political commentator of The Jordan Times and retired Jordanian Ambassador.

Career
He was employed as political commentator at the Amman Broadcasting Service and lecturer at the Teacher Training Centre in Ramallah.
From 1967 to 1970 he was third secretary of the embassy in Baghdad (Iraq).
From 1970 to 1972 he was first secretary of the embassy in Washington, D.C.
From 1972 to 1973 he was employed in the Foreign Ministry in Amman.
From 1973 to 1977 he was counselor of the embassy in London. 
From 1978 to 1990 he was ambassador in Brussels with concurrent Diplomatic accreditation in The Hague and the European Community.
From 1990 to 1995 he was ambassador in Rome.
From 1995 to 2000 he was Permanent Representative next to the Headquarters of the United Nations.

References

1935 births
Living people
Ambassadors of Jordan to Belgium
Ambassadors of Jordan to Italy
American University of Beirut alumni
Permanent Representatives of Jordan to the United Nations